Gap junction alpha-10 protein, also known as connexin-62 (Cx62), is a protein that in humans is encoded by the GJA10 gene.

Connexins, such as GJA10, are involved in the formation of gap junctions, intercellular conduits that directly connect the cytoplasms of contacting cells. Each gap junction channel is formed by docking of 2 hemichannels, each of which contains 6 connexin subunits.

References

Further reading

Integral membrane proteins

Connexins